The Meshwesh (often abbreviated in ancient Egyptian as Ma) was an ancient Libyan Berber tribe, along with other groups like Libu and Tehenou/Tehenu.

Early records of the Meshwesh date back to the Eighteenth Dynasty of Egypt from the reign of Amenhotep III. During the 19th and 20th dynasties (c. 1295 – 1075 BC), the Meshwesh were in almost constant conflict with the Egyptian state. During the late 21st Dynasty, increasing numbers of Meswesh Libyans began to settle in the Western Delta region of Egypt. They would ultimately take control of the country during the late 21st Dynasty first under Osorkon the Elder. After an interregnum of 38 years, during which the native Egyptian kings Siamun and Psusennes II assumed the throne, the Meshwesh ruled Egypt throughout the 22nd and 23rd Dynasties under many pharaohs as Shoshenq I, Osorkon I, Osorkon II, Shoshenq III and Osorkon III.

Libyan origins
That the Meshwesh were of Libyan origin is explicitly stated in a genealogy contained on the stela of Pasenhor (dated to the reign of Shoshenq V), where the great chiefs of the Meshwesh (including the kings of the 22nd Dynasty) are stated to be the descendants of "Buyuwawa the Libyan." The Libyo-Berber origin of the Meshwesh is also indicated in their personal names (such as Osorkon, Takelot, Nimlot, Shoshenq, etc.) and a handful of non-Egyptian titles used by these people that are related to the Berber languages. After the Egyptians, the Greeks, Romans, and Byzantines mentioned various other tribes in Libya.  Later tribal names differ from the Egyptian ones but, probably, some tribes were named in the Egyptian sources and the later ones, as well. The Meshwesh tribe represents this assumption. Some scholars argue it would be the same tribe called Mazyes by Hecataeus of Miletus and Maxyes by Herodotus, while the tribe was called Mazices and Mazax in Latin sources.

History 

The Meshwesh are known from ancient Egyptian texts as early as the 18th Dynasty, where they are mentioned as a source of cattle provided to king Amenhotep III's palace at Malkata. This indicates there may have been some trade relations between the Meshwesh and the Egyptians at the time. At the very least, it can be said that the Egyptians were familiar with the Meshwesh. For the remainder of the 18th Dynasty, information about Meshwesh or Libyans in general is sketchy. There are, however, representations of Libyans (perhaps Meshwesh) from the reign of Akhenaten, including a remarkable papyrus depicting a group of Libyans slaying an Egyptian. However, the papyrus is fragmentary, so it is not known what the historical context was. The Meshwesh or Ma were nomad hunter pastoralists, living off their goats, camels and other livestock while hunting and gathering at the same time. Milk, meat, hides and wool were gathered from their livestock for food, tents and clothing.

The first ancient Egyptian sources described the Meshwesh men with tattoos and long hair with longer side locks in the front, while centuries later they appear with shorter hair of Egyptian influence but braided and beaded, neatly parted in both sides from their temples and decorated with one or two feathers attached to leather bands around the crown of the head. They still used the same robes as before, a thin mantle of antelope hide, dyed and printed, crossing one of their shoulders and coming down until mid calf length to make an open robe over a loincloth with an adorned phallus sheath, being the only exception of the new addition of a kilt above the knees and an animal tail in the Egyptian manner of king Narmer and the phallus adornment over it. Men wore facial hair trimmed except at their chin and the older men kept their longer chin tufts braided. Women wore the same robes as men, plaited, decorated hair and both genders wore heavy jewelry. Later images showed them to have accepted and adapted some Greek or Macedonian tunics. Weapons included bows and arrows, hatchets, spears and daggers.

The relations between the Libyans and the Egyptians during the Ramesside Period were typically one of constant conflict. Battle reliefs at Karnak from the reign of Seti I depict the king in combat with Libyan masses; however the text only describes the Libyans as being Tjehenu, one of the generic terms for "Libyan" in the Egyptian language, rather than a specific tribal designation. During the following reign, that of Ramesses II, the Egyptians constructed a series of coastal fortresses running west to the region of Marsa Matruh, including at  al-Alamayn and  Zawayat Umm al-Rakham. The presence of these fortresses indicates a serious threat from the west, and Ramesses does claim to have overthrown Libyans in various rhetorical texts. However, as with Seti I, he does not specify if Meshwesh were involved or not.

During the reign of Merneptah it seems that the early-warning system from his father's time had fallen into disrepair, as there was an unexpected Libyan invasion into the Nile Delta and the Western Oases in Year 5 of his reign. Unlike his predecessors, Merenptah states in his battle reliefs at Karnak that it was primarily the Libu tribe who led the conflict, but that Meshwesh and Sea People allies were also involved. Indeed, Merenptah claims that "9,100 swords of the Meshwesh" were captured. (This conflict is also described on the Merneptah Stele, also known as the Israel Stele.)

About twenty-five years later, during the reign of Ramesses III, the growing conflict between the Egyptians and Libyans came to a head. This time, it was the Meshwesh who instigated the conflict, though other Libyan tribes and their Sea People allies were involved in fighting two major campaigns against the Egyptian king, in Ramesses III's Regnal Years 5 and 11. The Year 11 campaign was concerned almost exclusively with the Meshwesh, however. Ramesses claimed victory, and settled the Meshwesh in military concentration camps in Middle Egypt in order to force their assimilation into Egyptian culture and press them into military service for the Egyptian state. According to Papyrus Harris I, Ramesses "settled [them] in strongholds of the Victorious King, they hear the language of the [Egyptian] people, serving the King, he makes their language disappear."

A Third Intermediate Period text mentions there being at least five "Fortresses of the Meshwesh" in the area of Herakleopolis Magna; these were probably the ones established by Ramesses. Throughout the 20th Dynasty, various texts on ostraca and papyri mention attacks by Meshwesh tribesmen as far south as Thebes, where the workmen of Deir el-Medina were forced to seek protection inside the mortuary temple of Medinet Habu.

During the late Third Intermediate Period, the Nile Delta hosted the four great chiefdoms of the Meshwesh, each ruled by a "Great Chief of the Ma", whose seats of power were in the cities of Mendes, Sebennytos, Busiris and Per-Sopdu respectively; other lesser chiefdoms, led by a simple "Chief of the Ma", were located at Sais and Pharbaithos.

References

Bates, Oric. 1914. The Eastern Libyans: An Essay. Cass Library of African Studies 87. London: Frank Cass and Company Limited. 
Dodson, Aidan Mark. 1995. "Rise & Fall of The House of Shoshenq: The Libyan Centuries of Egyptian History." KMT: A Modern Journal of Ancient Egypt 6 (3):52–67.
Gomaà, Farouk. 1974. Die libyschen Fürstentümer des Deltas von Tod Osorkons II. bis zur Wiedervereinigen Ägyptens durch Psametik I. Tübinger Atlas des Vorderen Orients (Reihe B [Geistewissenschaften]) 6. Wiesbaden: Dr. Ludwig Reichert Verlag.
Haring, Bernardus Johannes Jozef. 1992. "Libyans in the Late Twentieth Dynasty". In Village Voices: Proceedings of the Symposium 'Texts from Deir el-Medîna and Their Interpretation,' Leiden, May 31–June 1, 1991, edited by Robert Johannes Demarée and Arno Egberts. Centre of Non-Western Studies Publications 13. Leiden: Centre of Non-Western Studies, Leiden University. 71–80.
Kitchen, Kenneth Anderson. [1996]. The Third Intermediate Period in Egypt (1100–650 BC). 3rd ed. Warminster: Aris & Phillips Limited.
Leahy, M. Anthony. 1985. "The Libyan Period in Egypt: An Essay in Interpretation." Libyan Studies 16:51–65.
———, ed. 1990. Libya and Egypt c1300–750 BC. London: School of Oriental and African Studies, Centre of Near and Middle Eastern Studies, and The Society for Libyan Studies.
Snape, Steven. 2003. "The Emergence of Libya on the Horizon of Egypt". In Mysterious Lands, edited by David B. O'Connor and Stephen G. J. Quirke. Encounters with Ancient Egypt 5. London: Institute of Archaeology, University College London and UCL Press. 93–106.
Wainwright, Geoffrey Avery. 1962. "The Meshwesh." Journal of Egyptian Archæology 48:89–99.
White, Donald. 1994. "Before the Greeks Came: A Survey of the Current Archaeological Evidence for the Pre-Greek Libyans." Libyan Studies 25 (Cyrenaican Archaeology: An International Colloquium):31–39, 43–44.
Yoyotte, Jean. 1961. "Les principautés du Delta au temps de l'anarchie libyenne (Études d'histoire politique)". In Mélanges Maspero. Volume 1: Orient ancien. Mémoires publiés par les membres de l'Institut français d'archéologie orientale du Caire 66/1 (fascicle 4). Cairo: Imprimerie de l'Institut français d'archéologie orientale du Caire. 121–181.

See also
Ancient Libya
Libu
Phut

Military history of ancient Egypt
Sea Peoples
African nomads
Nile Delta
Ancient Libya
Egypt–Libya relations
Ancient Libyans
Berber peoples and tribes